Patrick Martens (born 4 April 1978) is a Dutch actor. He is known for his role in the youth soap opera Zoop. He also played the role of Morris Fischer in the soap opera Goede tijden, slechte tijden.

Career 

In 2008, he participated in the 8th season of the popular television show Wie is de Mol?. In 2020, he appeared in a special anniversary edition of a show, called Wie is de Mol? Renaissance, which featured only contestants of previous seasons.

In 2012, he appeared in an episode of the game show De Jongens tegen de Meisjes. In 2014, he appeared in the film Gooische Vrouwen 2.

In 2021, he appeared in the photography game show Het perfecte plaatje in which contestants compete to create the best photo in various challenges. He finished in first place.

Filmography

As contestant 

 2008: Wie is de Mol?
 2012: De Jongens tegen de Meisjes
 2020: Wie is de Mol? Renaissance (anniversary season)
 2021: Het perfecte plaatje
 2023: Beat the Champions VIPS

References

External links 

 

Living people
1978 births
People from Breda
Dutch male film actors
Dutch male television actors
21st-century Dutch male actors
Dutch television presenters
Dutch male soap opera actors